For the Eurovision Song Contest 1999, Germany was represented by "Reise nach Jerusalem – Kudüs'e Seyahat", performed by Sürpriz. Both parts of the title translate to "Journey to Jerusalem" in English, in Germany "Reise nach Jerusalem" also is the name for the party game musical chairs.

Before Eurovision

Countdown Grand Prix 1999 
On March 12, the German final was held at the Stadthall in Bremen, and was hosted by Axel Bulthaupt and Sandra Studer (who had taken part in 1991, representing Switzerland as Sandra Simo). There were 11 songs in the final, and the winner was decided by televoting - which was also open to Swiss viewers, since song number 9 was performed by a Swiss act. (Due to their bottom placing in 1998, Switzerland were not taking part.) Michael von der Heide would represent Switzerland in 2010.

Between the guests of the show was Giora Feidman and the music producer Thomas M. Stein.

On 16 March 1999, it was announced that the winning song, being "Hör den Kindern einfach zu" performed by Corinna May, had been released in 1997 by another act and was thus disqualified, since entering a cover song was contrary to the rules. She would later represent the country in 2002. Wind had represented Germany on three previous occasions: 1985, 1987 and 1992.

At Eurovision
Germany performed 21st on the night of the contest, following Malta and preceding Bosnia and Herzegovina. At the end of the voting, "Reise nach Jerusalem – Kudüs'e Seyahat" received 140 points (12 points from Israel, Netherlands, Poland, Portugal and Turkey), finishing 3rd of 23 countries.

Voting

References

1999
Countries in the Eurovision Song Contest 1999
Eurovision
Eurovision